The 2019–20 season was the 123rd season of competitive football in Scotland. The domestic season began on 12 July 2019, with the first round of matches in the 2019–20 Scottish League Cup. The 2019–20 Scottish Professional Football League season started on 2 August 2019.

All competitive matches affiliated with the Scottish Football Association were postponed indefinitely on 13 March 2020, due to the COVID-19 pandemic.

Transfer deals

Celtic transfer defender Kieran Tierney to Arsenal for £25 million, a record fee for both a player sold by a Scottish club and for a deal involving a Scottish player.

League competitions
On 15 April 2020, all divisions in the SPFL below the Scottish Premiership were concluded, and all play-off matches were cancelled, as clubs chose to curtail the season due to the pandemic. On 18 May, the Premiership was curtailed and Celtic declared champions. Final league standings across the four SPFL leagues were determined by the average number of points per game.

Other leagues in Scotland were decided on a points per games basis, or declared null and void.

Scottish Premiership

Scottish Championship

Scottish League One

Scottish League Two

Non-league football

Level 5

Level 6

Honours

Cup honours

Non-league honours

Senior

Junior
West Region

East Region

North Region

Individual honours

PFA Scotland awards
Due to the covid-19 pandemic, PFA Scotland cancelled their awards for the 2019–20 season.

SFWA awards

Scottish clubs in Europe

Summary

Celtic
UEFA Champions League

UEFA Europa League
Having lost in Champions League qualifying to CFR Cluj, Celtic dropped into the Europa League playoff round.

Group Stage

Knockout Stage

Rangers
UEFA Europa League

Group Stage

Knockout Stage

Kilmarnock
UEFA Europa League

Aberdeen
UEFA Europa League

Scotland national team

Women's football
Glasgow City won their 13th consecutive Scottish national title in the 2019 season, which was completed on 24 November with the Scottish Women's Cup final.

2019 was officially the last season of the SWFL First Division and SWFL Second Division, after 20 years (replaced by the SWF Championship and SWFL regional divisions).

League and Cup honours

Individual honours

SWPL awards

Scottish Women's Premier League

SWPL 1

SWPL 2

UEFA Women's Champions League

Glasgow City
Glasgow City entered the Champions League in the round of 32, and were seeded at that stage. City eliminated Russian side Chertanovo to progress to the last 16, where they defeated Danish club Brøndby after a penalty shootout. This meant that City progressed to the quarter-finals, which were originally scheduled for March 2020 but were rescheduled and reformatted due to the coronavirus pandemic.

Hibernian
Hibernian entered the Champions League in the qualifying group phase. They progressed to the last 32, where they were unseeded, by winning their group.

Scotland women's national team

Deaths

August: Jimmy Fleming, 90, Stirling Albion and Berwick Rangers full back.
22 August: Junior Agogo, 40, Hibernian forward.
4 September: Kenny Mitchell, 62, Greenock Morton defender.
16 September: Bobby Prentice, 65, Heart of Midlothian winger.
18 September: Fernando Ricksen, 43, Rangers defender.
23 October: John Fleming, 62, referee and SFA official.
11 November: Bill Barr, Ayr United chairman.
25 November: Martin Harvey, 78, Raith Rovers assistant manager.
11 December: Ian Young, 76, Celtic and St Mirren defender.
18 December: Tom White, 80, Raith Rovers, St Mirren, Hearts and Aberdeen forward.
20 December: Billy Hughes, 70, Scotland forward.
22 December: Duncan MacKay, 82, Celtic, Third Lanark and Scotland defender.
6 January: Danny Masterton, 65, Ayr United, Clyde and Queen of the South forward.
15 January: Bobby Brown, 96, Queen's Park, Rangers, Falkirk and Scotland goalkeeper; St Johnstone and Scotland manager.
March: Dave Souter, 79, Dundee United, Arbroath, Berwick Rangers, East Fife, Clyde and Dundee winger and defender.
30 March: Alex Forsyth, 91, Albion Rovers and East Stirlingshire outside right.
11 April: Peter Bonetti, 78, Dundee United goalkeeper.
23 April: John Murphy, 77, Ayr United defender.
April: John Freebairn, Partick Thistle and Montrose goalkeeper.
2 May: John Ogilvie, 91, Hibernian defender.
26 May: Christian Mbulu, 23, Motherwell defender.

Notes and references

 
Seasons in Scottish football
S
S